Dalia Wood (21 August 1924 – 6 January 2013) was a member of the Senate of Canada.

Born in Montreal, Quebec, she was the president of the Liberal Party of Canada in Quebec and the riding association of Mount Royal, Prime Minister Pierre Trudeau's riding. She was appointed to the senate on 26 March 1979 on the recommendation of Pierre Trudeau. She represented the senatorial division of Montarville, Quebec until her resignation on 31 January 1999.

Wood died on January 6, 2013.

References

External links 
 

1924 births
2013 deaths
Canadian senators from Quebec
Politicians from Montreal
Women members of the Senate of Canada
Women in Quebec politics